The sympathetic ganglia, or paravertebral ganglia are autonomic ganglia, of the sympathetic nervous system. Ganglia are 20,000 to 30,000 afferent and efferent nerve cell bodies that run along on either side of the spinal cord. Afferent nerve cell bodies bring information from the body to the brain and spinal cord, while efferent nerve cell bodies bring information from the brain and spinal cord to the rest of the body. The cell bodies create long sympathetic chains that are on either side of the spinal cord. They also form para- or pre-vertebral ganglia of gross anatomy.

The efferent nerve cell bodies bring information from the brain to the body regarding perceptions of danger. This perception of danger can instigate the fight-or-flight response associated with the sympathetic nervous system. The fight-or-flight response is adaptive when there is a real and present danger which can be avoided or diminished through increased sympathetic activity. Sympathetic activity could be increased heart rate, dilated pupils, or sweaty palms, for example. The fight-or-flight response is maladaptive when the danger is imagined, prolonged, or when it lasts after the threat is over. When the intensity or duration of the response is excessive, the individual may meet criteria for a variety of psychological disorders. Neuroblastoma tumors can arise from the sympathetic ganglia tissue.

Structure

Sympathetic chain ganglia
The bilaterally symmetric sympathetic chain ganglia, also called the paravertebral ganglia, are located just ventral and lateral to the spinal cord. The chain extends from the upper neck down to the coccyx, forming the unpaired coccygeal ganglion. Each ganglion within this chain is either cervical, thoracic, lumbar, or sacral. Preganglionic nerves from the spinal cord synapse at one of the chain ganglia, and the postganglionic fiber extends to an effector, a visceral organ in the thoracic cavity, abdominal cavity, or pelvic cavity.

There are usually 22–23 pairs of these ganglia:
3 in the cervical region (cervical ganglia), 11 in the thoracic region (note the presence of the stellate cervicothoracic ganglia), 4 in the lumbar region and 4–5 in the sacral region. Throughout human evolution, the first thoracic and inferior cervical ganglia merged - and this resulting ganglion is called the stellate ganglion (so called because of its radiating pattern similar in appearance to a star).

The general rule of interaction of the nerve fibers in the sympathetic nervous system begins at the spinal cord. Here they arise from the thoracolumbar (T1–L2) regions' lateral horn of grey and emerge via the ventral root. They enter their respective spinal nerve (e.g. T5), and thus enter the white ramus communicans. This myelinated division can then enter the sympathetic chain.

Here four options are available to the fibers: (1) they can run up the chain and synapse, (2) they can synapse at the level of entry, (3) they can pass straight through and synapse elsewhere – such as in the case of T5–12 (the splanchnic nerves), or (4) they can enter the chain and descend to synapse. It is this ability to move superiorly and inferiorly along the chain that results in the mass response to the sympathetic nervous system. A preganglionic fibre may synapse to 15–20 postganglionic fibres. The postganglionic neurons extend across most of the body.

Upon exiting the sympathetic chain, the fibres enter a less-myelinated gray ramus communicans. There is still a myelin sheath present – just in far lower amounts compared to the white ramus communicans. This ramus then enters the spinal nerve and is sent to its synapsing target, or becomes a visceral branch to enter a plexus (e.g. the superficial or deep cardiac plexuses), or synapses directly onto a target.

Collateral ganglia
Neurons of the collateral ganglia, also called the prevertebral ganglia, receive input from the splanchnic nerves and innervate organs of the abdominal and pelvic region. These include the celiac ganglia, superior mesenteric ganglia, and inferior mesenteric ganglia.

Additional images

References

External links
 

Sympathetic nervous system